Darova ( or Darowa) is a commune in Timiș County, Romania. It is composed of three villages: Darova (commune seat), Hodoș and Sacoșu Mare. Ștefănești existed as a separate hamlet from 1885 to 1930, when it was merged into Darova, with Darova Nouă similarly absorbed in 1956.

History 
Darova was founded in 1786 by 57 families of German settlers from Silesia and Württemberg. It happened during the third wave of colonizations in Banat, under the reign of Emperor Joseph II. The name was given in honor of the government commissioner of Temes County, Count Johann Jankovits von Daruwar. Only two years after its founding, in the autumn of 1788, Darova was invaded by the Turks. Most of the younger settlers fled Darova and only a few returned after the Turks were driven out. In 1791, some of the German inhabitants of the village of Tormac settled in Darova. 

In 1885, on the northern edge of the village hearth, a new settlement was established, Istvánfalva (Ștefănești) or Darova Mică, where 72 families from Novo Selo, Torontál County, Serbian Banat were colonized. Historian Remus Crețan claims that this locality was Romanian. Many of these colonists left and were replaced by people from different localities in the area. Until 1930 Darova Mică was independent, after which it was incorporated into present-day Darova, being a neighborhood of it. 

Population movements continued in the years that followed. In 1892, Lutheran Slovaks from Békéscsaba and Nyitra were brought to David Kuhner's estate. On this occasion, a new short-lived hamlet was set up, called Imrefalva. In 1906 the hamlet was abolished and the Slovaks were assimilated to the Germans. In 1954 there was another hamlet, this time Romanian, called Darova Nouă. It was however absorbed by Darova.

Demographics 

Darova had a population of 3,049 inhabitants at the 2011 census, down 5% from the 2002 census. Most inhabitants are Romanians (84.42%), with a minority of Ukrainians (10.79%). For 3.74% of the population, ethnicity is unknown. By religion, most inhabitants are Orthodox (73.07%), but there are also minorities of Pentecostals (11.54%), Baptists (3.9%), Greek Catholics (2.23%), Adventists (1.54%) and Roman Catholics (1.28%). For 3.97% of the population, religious affiliation is unknown.

References 

Communes in Timiș County
Localities in Romanian Banat